Krankschaft are an English rock band.

Krankschaft was the briefly used title of a backing band for Robert Calvert, a vocalist, poet and playwright best known for his work as vocalist in the space rock group Hawkwind in the 1970s. Crucial members of this group were Steve Pond, Dead Fred and drummer Mick Stupp, who were all active in the punk rock group Inner City Unit, a band founded by Hawkwind co-founder / early frontman Nik Turner, as well as a group called The Maximum Effect.

The duo of Pond and Reeves played a Robert Calvert tribute concert in 2008, subsequently reuniting fully. They worked on a studio album, 'The Flame Red Superstar', and have since become favourites on the psychedelic festival circuit in Britain. Dead Fred was invited to join Hawkwind in 2013 and left Krankschaft accordingly.

Today's Krankschaft consists of Steve Pond on guitars/vocals/synths. ex The Enid bassist Alex Tsentides and Kevin Walker on drums. The band rebooted in 2013 with all new material written by the band a move conceived deliberately to stop trading on their past.

Now operating as a trio the band released their Third studio album "Three" in late 2014 and followed this up with III:Mysteries in 2017. During the recording of III:Mysteries Steve Pond was diagnosed with cancer but following surgery has subsequently returned to live work.

As of 2019 the group have recorded three official studio albums, one special album (composed of music made to poems submitted online by fans) and two live albums.

Albums 

English rock music groups